Strazhets may refer to the following places in Bulgaria:

Strazhets, Kardzhali Province
Strazhets, Razgrad Province